The Mattoon Phillies was a primary nickname for the minor league baseball teams based in Mattoon, Illinois between 1899 and 1957. Mattoon teams played as members of the Indiana–Illinois League (1899), Kentucky–Illinois–Tennessee League (1906), Eastern Illinois League (1907–1908), Illinois State League (1947–1948), Mississippi–Ohio Valley League (1949–1955) and Midwest League (1956–1957).

Mattoon teams played as a minor league affiliate of the Chicago White Sox in 1947, Cleveland Indians in 1948, Cincinnati Reds in 1952, Philadelphia Phillies from 1953 to 1956 and Kansas City Athletics in 1957. 

The franchise was the oldest in the Midwest League, evolving to become today's Fort Wayne TinCaps.

History
The Mattoon Phillies were a charter member of the Midwest League in 1953. Additionally, Mattoon teams played in the two leagues directly preceding the Midwest League: the Mississippi–Ohio Valley League and the Illinois State League . 

Earlier, Mattoon teams played in the Eastern Illinois League (1907–1908), Kentucky–Illinois–Tennessee League (1906) and Indiana–Illinois League (1899). Mattoon was an affiliate of the Chicago White Sox (1947), Cleveland Indians (1948), Cincinnati Reds (1952), Philadelphia Phillies (1953–1956) and Kansas City Athletics (1957). 

The Mattoon Illinois State League franchise was the direct result of the efforts of the Mattoon Athletic Association, which was formed in 1947 by William Zurheider, Clyde Kirk and Charles Heath. The corporation issued 600 shares of stock at $250 and built a new ballpark. Charles Heath was also a founder of the ISL.

Mattoon had two no-hitters. On August 24, 1954 Tom Cronin defeated the Hannibal Cannibals 2–0 in a no-hitter. On July 16, 1956 Mike Wallace pitched a no-hitter against the Clinton Pirates, winning 6–0.

In 1958, the Mattoon franchise moved to Keokuk, Iowa and became the Keokuk Indians. The franchise is the oldest in the Midwest League, as it has evolved into today's Fort Wayne TinCaps.

The ballpark
From 1947 to 1956 Mattoon teams were noted to have played minor league home games at the Mattoon Baseball Park. The ballpark hosted the 1948 Illinois State League All–Star Game and the 1950 Mississippi–Ohio Valley League All–Star Game. Baseball Hall of Fame member Earl Weaver played in the 1948 game. The ballpark had a capacity of 2,500 and was destroyed shortly after minor league team moved. The Mattoon Baseball Park was located at DeWitt Avenue & North Logan Street, Mattoon, Illinois.

Timeline

Notable alumni

Lew Krausse, Sr. (1957, MGR)
Art Mahaffey (1956) 3x MLB All-Star
Jimmie Coker (1955)
Jim Golden (1954–1955)
Dallas Green (1955) Manager: 1980 World Series Champion – Philadelphia Phillies; Philadelphia Phillies Wall of Fame
Don Landrum (1954)
Grover Lowdermilk (1908)
Larry Doyle (1906) 1915 NL Batting Champion; 1912 NL Most Valuable Player
Pug Bennett (1899)
Roy Brashear (1899)
Dummy Taylor (1899) 
Bob Wicker (1899)

See also
Mattoon Giants players Mattoon Indians players Mattoon Phillies players  Mattoon-Charleston Canaries players

References

Defunct Midwest League teams
Defunct baseball teams in Illinois
Philadelphia Phillies minor league affiliates
Coles County, Illinois
1899 establishments in Illinois
1956 disestablishments in Illinois
Illinois State League
Mississippi-Ohio Valley League
Defunct minor league baseball teams
Professional baseball teams in Illinois
Baseball teams disestablished in 1956
Baseball teams established in 1953